The Colin Stakes is a Canadian Thoroughbred horse race run annually during the later half of July at Woodbine Racetrack in Toronto, Ontario. Open to two-year-old horses, it is contested over a distance of 6 furlongs on Tapeta and currently carries a purse of $95,800.

Inaugurated in 1956 at Fort Erie Racetrack, the great filly La Prevoyante won the 1972 race by beating her male counterparts then went on to a career that would see her inducted in both the Canadian Horse Racing Hall of Fame and the U.S. Racing Hall of Fame. The 1982 edition was won by Sunny's Halo who won the following year's Kentucky Derby. In 2004, Francine Villeneuve became the first female jockey to win the race.

Since inception, the Colin Stakes has been run at various distances:
 5 furlongs : 2006 at Woodbine Racetrack
  furlongs : 1956-1957, 1959 at Fort Erie Racetrack
 6 furlongs : 1958, 1960-1966 at Fort Erie Racetrack, 1980-2005, 2007 at Woodbine Racetrack
  furlongs : 1967-1976 at Fort Erie Racetrack, 1977-1979 at Woodbine Racetrack

Records
Speed  record: 
 1:09.44 - Riker (2015) (at current distance of 6 furlongs)

Most wins by an owner:
 3 - Jean-Louis Levesque (1963, 1972, 1978)

Most wins by a jockey:
 5 - David Clark (1983, 1984, 1987, 2005, 2011)

Most wins by a trainer:
 3 - Daniel J. Vella (1994, 1995, 1997)

Winners of the Colin Stakes

References

Ungraded stakes races in Canada
Flat horse races for two-year-olds
Recurring sporting events established in 1956
Woodbine Racetrack
Fort Erie Race Track